Çatal station is a railway station on the Torbalı-Ödemiş railway, located in the district of Bayındır, Turkey. Çatal is named for the junction just east of the station where the Çatal-Tire railway branches off.

References

Railway stations in İzmir Province
Railway stations opened in 1883
1883 establishments in the Ottoman Empire
Bayındır District